Sagittaria sagittifolia (also called arrowhead due to the shape of its leaves) is a flowering plant in the family Alismataceae, native to wetlands most of Europe from Ireland and Portugal to Finland and Bulgaria, and in Russia, Ukraine, Siberia, Japan, Turkey, China, India, Australia, Vietnam and the Caucasus. It is also cultivated as a food crop in some other countries. In Britain it is the only native Sagittaria.

Sagittaria sagittifolia is a herbaceous perennial plant, growing in water from 10–50 cm deep. The leaves above water are arrowhead-shaped, the leaf blade 15–25 cm long and 10–22 cm broad, on a long petiole holding the leaf up to 45 cm above water level. The plant also has narrow linear submerged leaves, up to 80 cm long and 2 cm broad. The flowers are 2-2.5 cm broad, with three small sepals and three white petals, and numerous purple stamens.

Cultivation and uses
The round tuber is edible. It tastes bland, with a starchy texture, similar to a potato but somewhat crunchier, even when cooked. In Vietnam, the plant's young petiole leaves and rhizomes are used for soups.

Remnants of Sagittaria sagittifolia have been found in the Paleolithic/Mesolithic site of Całowanie in Poland.

Sagittaria sagittifolia is used in Chinese medicine, and in 2006 seven new ent-rosane diterpenoids and a new labdane diterpene were purified from the plant. Four of these compounds (Sagittine A–D) exhibited antibacterial activity against Streptococcus mutans and Actinomyces naeslundii while another (Sagittine E) was only active against A. naeslundii (MIC = 62.5 μg ml–1). Recently, the same group identified five new diterpenoids from Sagittaria pygmaea. None displayed activity against A. actinomycetemcomitans, while four of the others were active against A. viscosus and three against S. mutans, of which 18-ß-D-3',6'-diacetoxyglucopyranosyl-ent-kaur-16-ene was the most active.

As a weed
Sagittaria sagittifolia can be weedy or invasive according to the USDA, Animal and Plant Health Inspection Service (APHIS), Plant Protection and Quarantine (PPQ). It also appears on state noxious weed lists for 46 states.

References

External links

Sorting Sagittaria names
Photo of Sagittaria sagittifolia tubers

sagittifolia
Root vegetables
Plants described in 1753
Taxa named by Carl Linnaeus
Flora of Europe
Flora of Russia
Flora of Australia
Flora of Siberia
Flora of Japan
Flora of Turkey
Flora of China
Flora of Vietnam
Flora of Armenia
Flora of Georgia (country)
Flora of Azerbaijan
Freshwater plants
Edible plants